Princess India of Afghanistan (Pashto/ Shahdukht Hindia, ; born 7 June 1929) is the youngest daughter of Amanullah Khan and Soraya Tarzi, who were respectively King and Queen of Afghanistan in the 1920s. She holds the title of princess of the royal house of Mohammadzai-Tarzi.

Princess India was born in Bombay, British India, five months after her father's abdication on 14 January 1929 and named in honor of the country they fled to exile. After an invitation by Queen Elena of Italy, the family eventually settled in Rome, where the princess grew up and continues to make her home. 

She was educated at Pension Marie-José, Gstaad, Switzerland, and Pontifical Gregorian University, Rome, Italy.

India visited Afghanistan for the first time in 1968, and started charity work for Afghan children seeking aid.

In the 2000s, Princess India formed the Mahmud Tarzi Cultural Foundation (MTCF) in Kabul, where she serves as vice chairman as of 2010. In 2006, Princess India was appointed Cultural Ambassador to Europe by the Afghan President, Hamid Karzai. She spends her time between Rome and Kabul and holds lectures at conferences throughout Europe.

In August 2019, Princess India was invited by the Afghan government to take part in the state's celebrations for Afghanistan's 100th anniversary of independence.

Personal life
Princess India has been married twice and has two daughters (from the first marriage) and a son (from the second marriage).

Princess India thinks of her mother as a positive figure in contemporary Afghanistan, calling her achievements "highly regarded by Afghans", and adding her speeches of "how she encouraged Afghan women to become independent, to learn how to read and write." Regarding women's rights in Afghanistan, India thinks that more education is needed for Afghan men to improve the situation. She also said of the burqa that it is "not an Afghan garment and is not even an Islamic garment".

In September 2011, Princess India of Afghanistan was honored by the Afghan-American Women Association for her work in women's rights. In 2012, Radio Azadi named her "Person of the Year" for her humanitarian work.

See also
Nancy Dupree

References

External links
 Afghanistan, Issues at stake and Viable Solutions: An Interview with H.R.H. Princess India of Afghanistan, by Enrica Garzilli, in Journal of South Asia Women Studies, January 2010.

1929 births
Living people
Afghan princesses
Barakzai dynasty
People from Mumbai
Pontifical Gregorian University alumni